Pij, jedi, veseli se... (trans. Eat, Drink, Be Happy...) is the fifth and the last studio album by Serbian and former Yugoslav hard rock band Griva, released in 1992.

Due to the situation in the Yugoslavia (which formally dissolved the same year the album was released) and the outbreak of Yugoslav Wars, the album was recorded for more than eighteen months, and, until the end of the recording, vocalist Zlatko Karavla was the only remaining Griva member of the members that started the recording (the album cover features only Karavla's image). Nevertheless, he decided to release the album under the Griva moniker for the independent record label Megaton. After the album release the band (although not actually existing during the album recording) officially disbanded.

Track listing
All songs were written by Zlatko Karavla.
"Da li znaš ovu pesmu?" - 2:32
"Srećan ti rođendan" - 3:20
"Kad dođe jutro" - 4:10
"Poljubi me malo niže" - 2:42
"Kaljinka" - 3:10
"Saznala bi kad bi htela" - 4:40
"Dođi sebi dok još imaš kome" - 2:40
"Samo nebo da ne padne" - 2:52
"Pij, jedi, veseli se..." - 2:46

Personnel
Zlatko Karavla - vocals, producer
Miroslav Maletić - guitar, drums
Momčilo Bajac - guitar, bass guitar, acoustic guitar
Siniša Cvetković - bass guitar, keyboards
Zoran Mraković - guitar (solo on "Poljubi me malo niže")
Bane Micić - keyboards, bass guitar (on "Dođi sebi dok još imaš kome")
Jan Šaš - mixed by
Rajko Ignjatić - mixed by
Ljubomir Pejić - recorded by
Saša Pavlović - recorded by
Žana - backing vocals

References 
Notes

Sources
Pij, jedi, veseli se... at Discogs
 EX YU ROCK enciklopedija 1960-2006,  Janjatović Petar;

External links 
Pij, jedi, veseli se... at Discogs

Griva albums
1988 albums